Provadia Municipality is a municipality (obshtina) in Varna Province, Northeastern Bulgaria. It is named after its administrative centre - the town of Provadia.

Settlements 

Provadia Municipality includes the following 25 places (towns are shown in bold):

Demography 
The following table shows the change of the population during the last four decades.

Religion 
According to the latest Bulgarian census of 2011, the religious composition, among those who answered the optional question on religious identification, was the following:

A majority of the population of Provadia Municipality identify themselves as Christians. At the 2011 census, 61.6% of respondents identified as Orthodox Christians belonging to the Bulgarian Orthodox Church.

See also
Provinces of Bulgaria
Municipalities of Bulgaria
List of cities and towns in Bulgaria

References

External links

 Official website 

Municipalities in Varna Province